Testosterone phenylpropionate (TPP) (brand name Testolent), or testosterone phenpropionate, also known as testosterone hydrocinnamate, is a synthetic anabolic-androgenic steroid (AAS) and an androgen ester – specifically, the C17β phenylpropionate ester of testosterone – which was formerly marketed in Romania. It was first synthesized in 1951 and was first described in the literature by 1953. The medication was an ingredient of several isolated AAS commercial products, but was never widely used. Testosterone phenylpropionate was also notably a component of Sustanon and Omnadren, as well as of Estandron Prolongatum, Lynandron Prolongatum, and Mixogen. TPP was previously available in Great Britain.

See also
 Nandrolone phenylpropionate

References

Androgens and anabolic steroids
Androstanes
Phenylpropionate esters
Testosterone esters
Substances discovered in the 1950s